The 2014–15 season of the Belgian Third Divisions was the 88th season of the third-tier football league in Belgium, since its establishment in 1926.

The league is composed of 36 teams divided into two groups of 18 teams each. Teams play only other teams in their own division.

Group A

Group B

No promotion playoffs contested. Deinze and Union Saint-Gilloise promoted to Second Division.

Third Division Overall Championship

Relegation playoffs

Acrenoise promoted to Third Division.

Belgian Third Division
Bel
3